Japan Air Lines Flight 404 was a passenger flight which was hijacked by Palestinian and Japanese terrorists on 20 July 1973.

The flight departed Amsterdam-Schiphol International Airport, Netherlands, on 20 July 1973, en route to Tokyo International Airport (Haneda), Japan, via Anchorage International Airport, Alaska, US. The aircraft was a Boeing 747-246B, with 123 passengers and 22 crew members on board. The passenger complement included five terrorists, led by Osamu Maruoka, a member of the Japanese Red Army, and the other four were members of the Popular Front for the Liberation of Palestine.

The flight was hijacked shortly after takeoff from Schiphol. In the course of the hijacking, a grenade carried by one of the skyjackers detonated, killing her and injuring the flight's chief purser. The lead hijacker almost immediately announced himself to air traffic control as El Kassar, hijacking the aircraft in the name of the Palestinian Liberation movement. After several Middle Eastern governments refused to permit Flight 404 to land, the plane eventually touched down in Dubai, in the United Arab Emirates. After several days on the ground, the terrorists demanded the release of Kozo Okamoto, survivor of the JRA's attack on Tel Aviv's Lod Airport.

After the Israeli government refused to release Okamoto, the hijackers flew the aircraft first to Damascus, Syria, and then to Benghazi, in Libya. On 23 July, 89 hours after the hijacking began, the passengers and crew were released; the hijackers then blew up the aircraft, making the incident the second hull loss of a Boeing 747. The first hull-loss was also the result of hijackers.

Maruoka escaped, and in 1977, led the hijacking of Japan Air Lines Flight 472. He remained a fugitive until 1987 when he was arrested in Tokyo after entering Japan on a forged passport. Given a life sentence, he died in prison on 29 May 2011.

References

404
Aircraft hijackings
Terrorist incidents in Asia in 1973
1973 in Japan
Accidents and incidents involving the Boeing 747
July 1973 events in Asia
Japanese Red Army
Terrorist incidents in the United Arab Emirates